Bulger may refer to:

People
 Andrew Bulger (1789–1858), British soldier and colonial administrator
 Charles W. Bulger (1851–1922), American architect
 Chet Bulger (1917–2009), American football player
 Daniel Delany Bulger (1865–1930), Irish athlete
 James Bulger (1990–1993), English boy abducted, tortured, and murdered by two ten-year-old boys
 Jason Bulger (born 1978), American baseball pitcher
 Jay Bulger (born1982), American film director and writer
 Lawrence Bulger (1870–1928), Irish rugby union player, athlete and doctor
 Marc Bulger (born 1977), former American football quarterback
 Michael Joseph Bulger (1867–1938), Irish rugby player, doctor, and Olympic official
 Paul G. Bulger (1913–2000), third president of Buffalo State College (1959–1967)
 Peggy Bulger, American folklorist and the director of the American Folklife Center at the Library of Congress
 Whitey Bulger (born James Joseph Bulger, Jr., 1929–2018), former American organized crime figure from Boston, Massachusetts (brother of William M. Bulger)
 William M. Bulger (born 1934), American politician, lawyer, and educator (brother of Whitey Bulger)

Places

Albania
 Bulgër, a village in the administrative unit of Rubik, Albania

United States
 Bulgers, Alabama, an unincorporated community in Tallapoosa County, Alabama
 Bulger, Pennsylvania, an unincorporated community in Smith Township, Washington County, Pennsylvania
 Bulger, West Virginia, an unincorporated community in Lincoln County, West Virginia

See also 
 Bolger (disambiguation)
 Boulger
 Bulgur

English-language surnames
Surnames of Irish origin